Tsar Asen is a village in Pazardzhik Municipality, Pazardzhik Province, southern Bulgaria.  it has 384 inhabitants. The village is located on one of the several roads between Pazardzhik and Panagyurishte. There is a copper mine in the vicinity.

Villages in Pazardzhik Province